State Highway 145 (SH 145) is a state highway in western Colorado.

Route description

The route begins in the south at its intersection with US 160 in the eastern portion of the city of Cortez. Just north of its midpoint between Rico and Sawpit, the road also passes very near and provides access to the town of Telluride as well as Trout Lake.

History

On May 24, 2019, a large boulder fell onto a section of SH-145 near Dolores and covered the roadway. It was deemed too impractical to move or destroy, and the highway was instead realigned in July, and the rock, named Memorial Rock, was dubbed a landmark.

Major intersections

References

External links

145
Transportation in Montezuma County, Colorado
Transportation in Dolores County, Colorado
Transportation in San Miguel County, Colorado
Transportation in Montrose County, Colorado
Colorado Western Slope